Haiyang Shan is a Type 072III-class landing ship of the East Sea Fleet of the People's Liberation Army Navy.

History
According to images that began circulating in January 2018, the Haiyang Shan appears to be the first ship to have an electromagnetic railgun installed aboard it. Although operational capabilities are not confirmed, the weapon is located at the bow of the ship with support or power modules installed on the deck.

References

Amphibious warfare vessels of the People's Liberation Army Navy